Carn na Criche is a mountain located in the Fannichs in the Scottish Highlands, between Meall a' Chrasgaidh and Sgùrr Mòr. Loch a' Mhadaidh is on the northern slopes.

References

Munros
Mountains and hills of the Northwest Highlands
Mountains under 1000 metres
One-thousanders of Scotland